is a song by Japanese voice actress idol unit Earphones. It was released on 3 July 2019 and was used as the soundtrack for 2019 anime movie,  Space Attendant Aoi. The song features whisper voice and kiss sound (chu) from all members. Prior to the single's release, they released video with members doing ASMR. Single's B-side, Wagamamana Allegory, was used as theme song for Puro Christmas 2018 at Sanrio Puroland.

Music video
Music video for "Churata Churaha" was directed by Pink ja Nakutemo. The video features Earphones doing photoshoot for the single's jacket and singing in the film roll.

Track listing

Charts

Release history

References 

Earphones (band) songs
2019 singles
2019 songs